Austin Iwuji Ammachi Augustine Amutu (born 20 February 1993), known as Austin Amutu, is a Nigerian professional footballer who plays as a forward for Egyptian Premier League club Al Masry SC.

Club career
Amutu started his playing career with youth team Karamone, later joined Mighty Jets of Jos where he started exploding his talents winning a lot of honours and awards such as the best striker of the team, team highest goal scorer ever for the team in a season and also was the youngest best striker of Mighty Jets ever signed. He made his way to limelight which made interest from teams locally and internationally but Warri Wolves were lucky to convince the powerful and ball shield attacker.

In April 2015, Amutu signed a loan deal from Warri Wolves to Malaysian club Kelantan during April transfer window. He impressed the fan after scored a goal in the 9th minutes of his debut game against Johor Darul Ta'zim F.C. in which they lost 1-3.

International career
He was only called up to Nigeria U-23 dream team VI squad at the 2015 Nigeria Super 6 Tournament.

Career statistics

Club

References

External links

1993 births
Living people
Nigerian footballers
Nigeria international footballers
Warri Wolves F.C. players
Kelantan FA players
ES Zarzis players
Nigeria Professional Football League players
Nigerian expatriate footballers
Hapoel Ironi Kiryat Shmona F.C. players
Yeni Malatyaspor footballers
Karamone F.C. players
Sri Pahang FC players
Al Masry SC players
Israeli Premier League players
TFF First League players
Malaysia Super League players
Egyptian Premier League players
Expatriate footballers in Israel
Expatriate footballers in Turkey
Expatriate footballers in Tunisia
Expatriate footballers in Malaysia
Expatriate footballers in Egypt
Nigerian expatriate sportspeople in Israel
Nigerian expatriate sportspeople in Turkey
Nigerian expatriate sportspeople in Tunisia
Nigerian expatriate sportspeople in Malaysia
Nigerian expatriate sportspeople in Egypt
Sportspeople from Jos
Association football forwards